Gabriel De Coster (born 25 October 2000) is a Belgian slalom canoeist who has competed at the international level since 2017.

Career
In October 2020 he was a surprise bronze medalist in the K1 event at the U23 European Championships.

On 6 May 2021, De Coster progressed to the semifinal of the 2021 European Championships, qualifying to represent Belgium in the K1 event at the delayed 2020 Summer Olympics in Tokyo. He finished 22nd after being eliminated in the heats.

De Coster delivered a breakthrough performance at the Pau round of the 2022 Canoe Slalom World Cup, winning the K1 event in a time of 97.94 seconds. This was Gabriel's first final at the senior level and marked Belgium's first World Cup victory.

Results

World Cup individual podiums

Complete World Cup results

Complete Championship Results

References

External links

 
 
 
 

2000 births
Living people
Belgian male canoeists
Olympic canoeists of Belgium
Canoeists at the 2020 Summer Olympics